Henriette Louise "Hette" Borrias (born 8 April 1953) is a retired Dutch rower. She competed at the 1976 Summer Olympics in the coxed fours, together with Liesbeth Vosmaer-de Bruin, Myriam van Rooyen-Steenman, Ans Gravesteijn and Monique Pronk, and finished in fifth place. She won a European title in this event in 1973 and finished fifth at the 1975 World championships. In late 1970s she focused on single sculls and won a bronze medal at the 1979 World Championships. Next year she competed in this event at the 1980 Summer Olympics, but failed to reach the final.

References

1953 births
Living people
Dutch female rowers
Olympic rowers of the Netherlands
Rowers at the 1976 Summer Olympics
Rowers at the 1980 Summer Olympics
Sportspeople from Eindhoven
World Rowing Championships medalists for the Netherlands
European Rowing Championships medalists
21st-century Dutch women
20th-century Dutch women